Gold Raiders is a 1951 comedy Western film starring George O'Brien and The Three Stooges (Moe Howard, Larry Fine and Shemp Howard). The picture was O'Brien's last starring role and the only feature film released during Shemp Howard's 1947–55 tenure with the trio.

Plot
In the old west, The Three Stooges are peddlers, traveling by covered wagon. George O'Brien, formerly a federal marshal, is now active in the new field of property insurance. O'Brien enlists the Stooges to help him outwit a gang of desperadoes, led by saloon owner Taggart (Lyle Talbot), who are robbing valuable gold-mine shipments.

Cast
 George O'Brien ...	George O'Brien
 Moe Howard	 ... Moe (billed as The Three Stooges)
 Larry Fine	 ...	Larry (billed as The Three Stooges)
 Shemp Howard ...	Shemp (billed as The Three Stooges)
 Clem Bevans ...	Doc Mason
 Sheila Ryan ...	Laura Mason
 Lyle Talbot ...	Taggart
 Monte Blue	 ...	John Sawyer
 Fuzzy Knight ...	Sheriff
 Hugh Hooker ... Sandy Evans
 John Merton ... Clete
 Remy Paquet ... Singer
 Al Baffert ...	Bartender (billed as Andre Adoree)
 Roy Canada ...	Slim
 Bill Ward ...	Henchman

Production
Gold Raiders was an attempt by independent producer Bernard Glasser to inaugurate a new western series starring George O'Brien, an action star since John Ford's 1924 epic The Iron Horse and later a top attraction in Western and outdoor-adventure features. The Three Stooges (who consisted at that time of Moe Howard, Larry Fine, and Shemp Howard) appear with O'Brien.

O'Brien and the Stooges receive roughly equal screen time. Sheila Ryan co-stars as the granddaughter of alcoholic doctor Clem Bevans, while silent-film star Monte Blue enjoys a larger part than usual as a local mine owner. Some of the stunts were performed by Hugh Hooker, who also plays a juvenile role.

Gold Raiders marked the second and last feature film with Shemp Howard as part of the Stooges. The first had been the team's original screen appearance, Soup to Nuts (1930), featuring the Stooges' original leader Ted Healy.

Production and budget 
The 56-minute Gold Raiders was economically filmed by director Edward Bernds, who directed many of the Stooges' comedy shorts. Bernds asked his colleague Elwood Ullman, who often wrote or co-wrote the Stooge shorts, to add comedy material to William Lively's straight western script. Bernds signed on for a 12-day filming schedule, brisk but feasible for a low-budget western. The director planned each day's work on paper, only to find that producer Bernard Glasser could not afford to keep the crew on salary for the full term. Glasser reduced the schedule twice before finally settling on a five-day schedule: December 26–30, 1950. Bernds, now faced with less than half the agreed-upon schedule, almost quit the project, but relented when Glasser pleaded with him to continue. Bernds later commented, "I should have never made that picture. It was an ultra-quickie shot in five days at a cost of $50,000 ($ today), which, even then, was ridiculously low. I'm afraid the picture shows it!" Fortunately for Bernds, most of the cast members and cameraman Paul Ivano were industry veterans, who could be relied upon to film the required scenes with a minimum of takes.

Producer Glasser had very little money left to promote the finished picture, and had to skimp on the publicity materials: a thin pressbook of newspaper ads complemented posters and lobby cards printed in only two colors (as opposed to full color).

Independent producer Jack Schwarz released Gold Raiders through United Artists in 1951. Although the principals worked well together, plans for an O'Brien-Stooges series were abandoned when George O'Brien and Bernard Glasser joined forces to pursue independent production in Europe.

United Artists reissued Gold Raiders to theaters in 1958, and television distributor AAP issued two home-movie abridgments on 8mm film in the 1960s.

Home media
Out of circulation for years, Gold Raiders was released on DVD in 2006 by Warner Bros.

See also
 The Three Stooges filmography

References

External links
 
 
 
 

1951 films
The Three Stooges films
American black-and-white films
Films directed by Edward Bernds
United Artists films
American slapstick comedy films
American Western (genre) comedy films
1950s Western (genre) comedy films
1951 comedy films
1950s English-language films
1950s American films